Suburban Kid is the debut solo album by the Australian singer-songwriter Kevin Mitchell, which was released under his pseudonym, Bob Evans. Mitchell is the lead vocalist of alternative rock group, Jebediah. The album was released on 8 September 2003 on Redline Records and was co-produced by Mitchell and Simon Struthers (Adam Said Galore). YourGigs website described it as "an album of youthful introspection, love and loss". Jason Ankeny (Allmusic) felt the album was "showcasing a more intimate, roots-flavored dimension of his songwriting". All the songs were written by Mitchell, although "The Hermit" was co-written with Luke Steele from The Sleepy Jackson. Luke's sister Katy Steele from Little Birdy provided backing vocals for the album.

The first single from the album, "Friday Come Five", was released 18 August 2003, with the second single, "Turn" released later in the year. Both tracks were put high rotation on Triple J when released and received solid support on Triple M and community radio stations around Australia. Film clips for both tracks aired on Rage, MTV Australia and CH[V]. In late 2003 Mitchell undertook a national acoustic tour, in support of the album's release, finishing up with a Festival of Perth performance alongside Evan Dando (The Lemonheads) and Tim Rogers (You Am I) in February 2004.

Background
Suburban Kid is the debut album by Bob Evans, the pseudonym of Australian singer-songwriter, Kevin Mitchell, from Jebediah. Mitchell created the name as a side-project in 1999, to play incognito solo shows in Perth:

From the age of 20, Mitchell had started to compile a list of acoustic guitar-based songs. They were inspired by his life in the Perth suburb of Bull Creek, Western Australia and by the age of 24 he had developed a concept for a solo album.

Suburban Kid was released on 8 September 2003 and was co-produced by Mitchell and Simon Struthers (Adam Said Galore). The first single, "Friday Come Five", was released ahead of the album on 18 August. The second single, "Turn" followed later in the year. Both tracks were put high rotation on radio station, Triple J, and received support on Triple M and community radio stations around Australia. The album was initially released by Redline Records and was subsequently re-released on 28 August 2006 by EMI Records following the success of his second Bob Evans album Suburban Songbook (2006). The suburban-based theme continued with his third album, Goodnight, Bull Creek! (2009).

Guest musicians on Suburban Kid include members of Jebediah, Ammonia, Adam Said Galore, Little Birdy, and End of Fashion. In late 2003 Mitchell undertook a national acoustic tour, in support of the album's release, finishing up with a Festival of Perth performance alongside Evan Dando (The Lemonheads) and Tim Rogers (You Am I) in February 2004.

Reception
YourGigs website previewed Bob Evans' 2009 tour and described Suburban Kid as "an album of youthful introspection, love and loss". Jason Ankeny (Allmusic) felt it "[showcased] a more intimate, roots-flavored dimension of his songwriting". Perth Sounds reviewer opined "[it] is a more personal affair allowing him to write honestly about long distance relationships, personal faults, good friends".

Track listing

Personnel
Credits according to album notes.

Musicians
Alan Balmont – drums
Billy Brothers – pedal steel guitar
Justin Burford – backing vocals
Michael Lake – drums
Matt Maguire – drums
Brett Mitchell – drums
Kevin Mitchell (aka Bob Evans) – piano, Maton acoustic guitar, vocals, other sounds
Katy Steele – backing vocals
Simon Struthers – bass guitar, other sounds
Vanessa Thornton – bass guitar

Production
Andrew Christie – artwork
Anthony Cormican – mastering at Loop Studios
Kevin Mitchell – producer at Simon's Place, mixer
Keli Morris – photography
Simon Struthers – recording engineer, mixer, producer at his home studio (Simon's Place)

Release history

References

External links
 
 
 Suburban Kid at Rate Your Music

2003 debut albums
Kevin Mitchell (musician) albums